South Korean singer Kim Junsu, also known by the stage name Xia, has released four studio albums, four EPs, 12 singles and 13 music videos as of November 2020. He has also participated in several K-drama soundtracks.

Albums

Studio albums

Single albums

Extended plays

Singles

As a lead artist

As featured artist

Soundtrack appearances

Other charted songs

Composing and songwriting

Videography

Music videos

DVDs

Notes

References

Discographies of South Korean artists
JYJ